The Wolverhampton Open was a combined men's and women's grass court tennis tournament founded in 1897 as the Wolverhampton Lawn Tennis Tournament. The first tournament was staged at Parkdale, Wolverhampton from 1897 to 1900 before it was discontinued in 1900. In 1903 a second tournament was revived and played in Newbridge, in Wolverhampton, where it ran until 1974.

History
The Wolverhampton Open were established in as Wolverhampton Lawn Tennis Tournament in 1897, under auspices of the Albert Lawn Tennis Club, Parkdale, Wolverhampton, Staffordshire, Midlands before it was discontinued in 1900. In 1903 a second Wolverhampton tournament was revived by Wolverhampton Lawn Tennis Club, in Newbridge. In 1931 the tournament was renamed as the Wolverhampton Open Lawn Tennis Tournament. By the 1950s it was branded as the Wolverhampton Open and ran until 1974.  In 1970 the event was marketed under the brand name the Bio-Strath Wolverhampton Open as part of the Bio-Strath Circuit, it remained part of that tour through till 1971.

Notbale winners of the men's singles title included; Sydney Howard Smith, Cam Malfroy, George Lyttleton-Rogers, Claude Lister, Tony Pickard, Bill Hoogs Jr., Frew McMillan, and Andrew Pattison. Winners of the women's singles championship included; Phoebe Holcroft Watson, Dorothy Holman, Rita Bentley, Angela Mortimer, Ann Haydon Jones, Faye Toyne, Mary Habicht, Kerry Melville and Valerie Ziegenfuss.

Venues
The Albert Lawn Tennis Club was founded at Parkdale, Wolverhampton, Staffordshire around 1894. It staged the first  Wolverhampton tennis tournament until 1900. In 1903 a second Wolverhampton tournament was revived by the Wolverhampton Lawn Tennis Club (f. 1885), in Newbridge, Wolverhampton.

Event Names
 Wolverhampton Lawn Tennis Tournament (1897-1900)
 Wolverhampton Tennis Tournament (1903-30)
 Wolverhampton Open Lawn Tennis Tournament (1931-49)
 Wolverhampton Open (1950-69)
 Bio-Strath Wolverhampton Open (1970-71)
 Wolverhampton Open (1972-74)

References

Defunct tennis tournaments in the United Kingdom
Grass court tennis tournaments